The Council of Ariminum, also known after the city's modern name as the Council of Rimini, was an early Christian church synod.

In 358, the Roman Emperor Constantius II requested two councils, one of the western bishops at Ariminum and one of the eastern bishops (planned for Nicomedia but actually held at Seleucia Isauria) to resolve the Arian controversy over the nature of the divinity of Jesus Christ, which divided the 4th-century church.

In July 359, the western council (of about 300 or over 400 bishops) met. Ursacius of Singidunum and Valens of Mursa soon proposed a new creed, drafted at the Fourth Council of Sirmium in 359 but not presented there, holding that the Son was similar to the Father "according to the scriptures," and avoiding the controversial terms "same substance" and "similar substance." Others favored the creed of Nicaea.

The opponents of Sirmium wrote a letter to the emperor Constantius, praising Nicaea and condemning any reconsideration of it, before many of them left the council. The supporters of Sirmium then issued the new creed and sent it through Italy.

The council was considered a defeat for trinitarianism, and Saint Jerome wrote: "The whole world groaned, and was astonished to find itself Arian."

Pope Liberius of Rome rejected the new creed, prompting Phoebadius of Agen and Servatius of Tongeren to withdraw their support from the homoian. The supporters of Sirmium deposed Liberius and reappointed Felix of Rome in his place.

Two councils at Nike (southeast of Adrianople) and Constantinople followed.

Those favoring the Creed drafted at Sirmium included:
 Ursacius of Singidunum
 Valens of Mursa
 Germinius of Sirmium
 Auxentius of Milan
 Demophilus of Beroe
 Gaius of Pannonia

Those favoring the Creed of Nicaea included:
 Phoebadius of Agen (died c. 392)
 Servatius of Tongeren (died May 13, 384)
 Gaudentius of Ariminum (died October 14, 360)
 Mercurialis of Forlì
 Restitutus of Carthage

References

Source and external links 
Catholic Encyclopedia: Council of Rimini

Ariminum, Council of
Ariminum, Council of
Ariminum, Council of
Rimini
Schisms in Christianity
Arianism
Rimini
359
Constantius II